Confrontation is an element of conflict wherein parties confront one another.

Confrontation or The Confrontation may also refer to:

Arts, entertainment, and media

Films  
 American Ninja 2: The Confrontation, a 1987 action film 
 The Confrontation (film), a 1969 Hungarian drama film

Gaming  
 Confrontation (Games Workshop), a wargame and forerunner to the Necromunda  wargame
 Confrontation (video game), a video game adaptation
 Confrontation (Rackham), a miniatures wargame
SOCOM U.S. Navy SEALs: Confrontation, a 2008 video game

Music  
 Confrontation (Bob Marley & The Wailers album) (1983)
 Confrontation (Face to Face album) (1985)
 Confrontation (Soilent Green album) (2005)
 "The Confrontation", a track on the 1970 soundtrack album The Owl and the Pussycat
 "The Confrontation", a song from Les Misérables

Television
 Confrontation (miniseries), a 1985 Soviet six-part television film
 "Confrontation", an episode of Death Note
 "Confrontation", an episode of Law & Order: Special Victims Unit
 "The Confrontation", an episode of The Simple Life

Other uses in arts, entertainment, and media
 Confrontation (journal), an American literary magazine founded in 1968

See also 
 Conflict (disambiguation)
 Confrontation analysis, an operational analysis technique
 Confrontation Clause, of the 6th Amendment to the U.S. Constitution
 Confrontation visual field test
 Indonesia–Malaysia confrontation, 1963–66